Dilara or Delara can be a given name or surname in several languages.

Delara (Persian: دل‌آرا-دلارا) is a Persian female first name popular in Iran and other Persian speaking countries such as Afghanistan and Tajikistan. 

Dilara is popular in Turkic countries such as Azerbaijan and Turkey. 

It is a compound word of Persian origin that consists of two parts: "Del"+"-ara". In Persian, "del" (دل) is a noun meaning heart, and "ara" is a suffix that comes from the Persian verb ārāstan (آراستن), meaning adorner, beautifier, and embellisher. According to the Dehkhoda Dictionary, Dilara can be translated as "she who delights the heart", "she who is pleasing" or "what makes heart beautiful". 

In the Shahnameh ("The Book of Kings"), the masterpiece of Ferdowsi (940–1025), Dilara was a prudent and wise queen in the time of the ancient Persian Empire. For hundreds of years since then in Persian literature, poets such as Saadi have used the name "Dilara" to refer a dearly loved woman who fills their hearts with joy and happiness.

Given name 
 Delara Burkhardt (born 1992), German politician
 Delara Darabi (1986–2009), Iranian woman executed for murder
 Dilara Aksüyek (born 1987), Turkish actress
 Dilara Aliyeva (1929–1991), Azerbaijani historian
 Dilara Bağcı (born 1994), Turkish volleyball player
 Dilara Begum Jolly (born 1960), Bangladeshi print artist, sculptor, installation artist, and painter
 Dilara Bilge (born 1990), Turkish volleyball player
 Dilara Bozan (born 1997), Turkish karateka
 Dilara Buse Günaydın (born 1989), Turkish swimmer
 Dilara Büyükbayraktar (born 1989), Turkish actress
 Dilara Eltemur, Turkish karateka (2018–2019 medal winner)
 Dilara Hanif Rita (born 1981), performing with the stage name Purnima (Bangladeshi actress)
 Dilara Harun (–2012), Bangladeshi revolutionary and politician
 Dilara Hashim (born 1936), Bangladeshi author and novelist
 Dilara Hava Tunç (born August 1998), German rapper and singer performing with the stage name Hava (musician)
 Dilara Kaya (born 1991), Turkish basketball player
 Dilara Kazimova (born 1984), Azerbaijani singer
 Dilara Lokmanhekim (born 1994), Turkish judoka
 Dilara Narin (born 2002), Turkish weightlifter
 Dilara Özlem Sucuoğlu (born 1998), Turkish-German footballer
 Dilara Türk (born 1996), Turkish-German women's footballer
 Dilara Uralp (born 1995), Turkish female windsurfer
 Dilara Yurtdaş (born 2004), Turkish artistic gymnast
 Dilara Zaman (born 1943), Bangladeshi actress
Sibel Kekilli (born 1980), Actress (was using stage name Dilara for her adult movies)

Television and film 
 Dilara, a 2018 Pakistani television series starring Kinza Razzak as Dilara
 Dilara, the leading character portrayed by Aybüke Pusat in the 2021 Turkish dark comedy streaming television series 50M2
 Dilara Giritli, a fictional character portrayed by Sinem Kobal in the 1990s Turkish television sitcom series Dadı
 Dilara Terzioğlu Gürpinar/Erguvan, a fictional character portrayed by Ebru Özkan in the 2014 Turkish television drama series Paramparça

Other 
 Aseptis binotata, a moth formerly known as Aseptis dilara and Hadena dilara

References 

Iranian feminine given names
Turkish feminine given names
Bangladeshi feminine given names